1800 may refer to:

 1800, events in the year 1800
 19th century, 1801–1900
 1800s decade, 1800-1809
 UTC+08:00, time zone

Telecommunications
 GSM-1800
 1-800; see Toll-free telephone number
 1800 Reverse

Other
 1800 Club, skyscraper in Miami
 1800 Tequila, alcoholic drink
 Arc 1800, ski resort area, France
 AMD Athlon XP 1800+. microprocessor
 BMW 1800, car
 EMC 1800 hp B-B
 Morris 1800, car
 Nokia 1800, phone
 NS Class 1800, electric locomotive
 Pratt & Whitney X-1800
 Telmac 1800, microcomputer
 Tobu 1800 series train in Japan
 Volvo P1800, car

See also

 
 180° (disambiguation)
 180 (disambiguation)